The third season of the Australian Dancing with the Stars TV series premiered on Tuesday 6 September 2005 and concluded on Tuesday 8 November 2005. Home and Away actress Ada Nicodemou and her partner Aric Yegudkin won the series, defeating Seven News presenter Chris Bath and her partner, Trenton Shipley.

Couples
The following celebrities competed.

Scoring chart
Red numbers indicate the couples with the lowest score for each week.
Green numbers indicate the couples with the highest score for each week.
 indicates the couple eliminated that week.
 indicates the returning couple that finished in the bottom two.
 indicates the winning couple.
 indicates the runner-up couple.
 indicates the third-place couple.

Dance schedule
The celebrities and professional partners will dance one of these routines for each corresponding week.

Week 1 : Cha-cha-cha or Waltz
Week 2 : Quickstep or Rumba
Week 3 : Tango or Jive
Week 4 : Paso doble or Foxtrot
Week 5 : Samba
Week 6 : One unlearned Ballroom or Latin dance from weeks 1-5
Week 7 : One unlearned Ballroom or Latin dance from weeks 1-6
Week 8 : One unlearned Ballroom or Latin dance from weeks 1-7 & Group Viennese Waltz
Week 9 : Final unlearned Ballroom or Latin dance from weeks 1-8 & Favourite Dance of Season
Week 10 : Two Favourite Dances of the Season & Freestyle

Dance chart

 Highest Scoring Dance
 Lowest Scoring Dance

Average Chart

The average chart is based on the dances performed by the celebrities and not their place in the competition.

Couples' highest and lowest scoring dances
Scores are based upon a 40-point maximum:

Highest and lowest scoring performances
The best and worst performances in each dance according to the judges' 40-point scale are as follows:

Running Order 
Individual judges scores in the chart below (given in parentheses) are listed in this order from left to right: Todd McKenney, Helen Richey, Paul Mercurio, Mark Wilson.

Week 1 

Running order

Week 2
Musical guests: 
Running order

Week 3
Musical guests: 
Running order

Week 4
Musical guests: Craig David
Running order

Week 5
Musical guests: 
Running order

Week 6
Musical guests: 
Running order

Week 7
Musical guests: Jimmy Barnes
Running order

Week 8
Musical guests: 
Running order

Week 9
Musical guests: 
Running order

Week 10
Musical guests: Human Nature, John Farnham
Running order

References

Season 03
2005 Australian television seasons